Kaufmann is a surname with many variants such as Kauffmann, Kaufman, and Kauffman. In German, the name means merchant. It is the cognate of the English Chapman (which had a similar meaning in the Middle Ages, though it disappeared from modern English). Kaufmann may refer to:

Kaufmann 

 Alexander Kaufmann (1817–1893), German poet and folklorist, brother of Leopold
 Aloys P. Kaufmann (1902–1984), Mayor of St. Louis, Missouri
 Andrea Kaufmann (born 1969), Austrian politician
 Andreas Kaufmann (born 1973), German footballer
 Andy Kaufmann (born 1967), American basketball player
 Arthur Kaufmann (1872–1938), Austrian attorney, philosopher and chess master
 Arthur Kaufmann (artist) (1888–1971, German avant-garde painter
 Bob Kauffman (1946–2015), American basketball player 
 Carl Kaufmann (1936–2008), West German sprint runner
 Christian Kaufmann (alpine guide) (1872-1939), Swiss mountain guide active in Canada
 Christian Kaufmann (canoeist) (born c. 1940), West German slalom canoeist
 Christine Kaufmann (1945–2017), German-Austrian actress, author, and businesswoman
 Christine Kaufmann (politician) (born 1951), Montana State Senate
 Daniel Kaufmann (footballer) (born 1990), Liechtensteiner footballer
 David Kaufmann (1852–1899), Jewish-Austrian scholar
 Dieter Kaufmann (born 1941), Austrian composer
 Edgar J. Kaufmann (1885–1955), US businessman and philanthropist 
 Eduard Kaufmann (1860–1931), German physician and co-discoverer of the Abderhalden–Kaufmann–Lignac syndrome
 Ernst Kaufmann (1895–1943), Swiss racing cyclist
 Eugen Kaufmann (1892–1984), German architect
 Evan Kaufmann (born 1984), German-American ice hockey player
 Fabio Kaufmann (born 1992), German-Italian footballer
 Felix Kaufmann (1895–1949), Austrian-American law philosopher
 Frank Kaufmann (born 1952), American peace activist
 Franz Kaufmann (1886–1944), German jurist and victim of the Holocaust
 Franziska Kaufmann (born 1987), Swiss curler
 Fritz Kaufmann (1905–1941), Swiss ski jumper and Nordic combined skier
 Georg Friedrich Kauffmann (1679–1735), Baroque composer from Thuringia (now in southern Germany)
 George Adams Kaufmann (1894–1963), British mathematician, translator and anthroposophist
 Gordon Kaufmann (1888–1949), English-born American architect
 Günther Kaufmann (1947–2012), German actor
 Hans Kaufmann (born 1948), Swiss politician and business consultant
 Heinz Kaufmann (1913–1997), German rower
 Herbert Kaufmann (1920–1976), German ethnologist, journalist, photographer and writer
 Hermann Kaufmann (born 1955), Austrian architect
 Hilde Kaufmann (1920–1981), German jurist and criminologist
 Isidor Kaufmann (1853–1921), Austro-Hungarian painter
 Joan Kaufman, American child psychologist
 Jonas Kaufmann (born 1969), German tenor 
 Judith Kaufmann (born 1962), German cinematographer
 Julia Kaufmann (born 1984), German voice actress
 Karl Kaufmann (painter) (1843–1905), Austrian landscape and architectural painter
 Karl Kaufmann (1900–1965), German Nazi Gauleiter in Hamburg
 Konstantin von Kaufmann (1818–1882), Russian general, for whom "Mount Kaufmann" (or "Peak Kaufmann", now called Lenin Peak) was named
 Klaus Kaufmann (born 1948), Austrian pianist who founded the Austrian-Chinese-Music-University
 Lars Kaufmann (born 1982), German handball player
 Leon Kaufmann (1872-1933), Polish painter and pastellist
 Leonhard Kaufmann (born 1989) Austrian footballer
 Leopold Kaufmann (1821–1898), German politician, brother of Alexander
 Malte Kaufmann (born 1976), German economist, entrepreneur and politician
 Maurice Kaufmann (1927–1997), British actor
 Max R. Kaufmann, designer of the Kaufmann font family
 Max Rudolf Kaufmann (1886–1963), Swiss author, translator, and journalist
 Michael Kaufmann (born 1964), German politician
 Myron Kaufmann (1921-2010), American author
 Nico Kaufmann (1916–1996), Swiss pianist and composer
 Oskar Kaufmann (1873–1956), Hungarian-German Jewish architect
 Patricia A. (Trish) Kaufmann of Lincoln, Delaware
 Peter Kaufmann (Alpine guide) (1872-1939), Swiss mountain guide from Grindelwald
 Peter Kaufmann (politician) (born 1947), politician and businessman in Winnipeg
 Peter Kaufmann-Bohren (1886-1971), Swiss mountain guide
 Rainer Kaufmann (born 1959), German film director
 Richard von Kaufmann (1850–1908), German jurist and art collector
 Rudolf Kaufmann (1909–1941), German palaeontologist and geologist, son of Walter (physicist)
 Sören Kaufmann (born 1971), German slalom canoeist
 Stefan Kaufmann (musician) (born 1960), German drummer
 Stefan Kaufmann (politician) (born 1969), German Bundestag member
 Stefan H.E. Kaufmann (born 1948), German microbiologist
 Stevie Kaufmann, (1913–2004), American socialite
 Sylvia-Yvonne Kaufmann (born 1955), German politician
 Theodore Kaufmann (1814–1896), German-American painter
 Ulrich Kaufmann (1840–1917), Swiss mountain guide
 Walter Kaufmann (author) (1924–2021), German-Australian writer
 Walter Kaufmann (composer) (1907–1984), Czech-born American ethnomusicologist
 Walter Kaufmann (philosopher) (1921–1980), German philosopher
 Walter Kaufmann (physicist) (1871–1947), German physicist
 William G. Kaufmann (1869–1947), American politician
 Yehezkel Kaufmann (1889–1963), Israeli philosopher and Biblical scholar

Given name
 Isaac Kaufmann Funk (1839–1912), American editor, lexicographer
 Kaufmann Kohler (1843–1926), German-born American Bible scholar, Reform rabbi and theologian

Kauffmann
 Guinevere Kauffmann (born 1968), German-American astrophysicist
 Henrik Kauffmann (1888-1962), Danish ambassador to United States of America
 Jean-Paul Kauffmann (born 1944), French journalist and writer
 Lillian von Kauffmann (1920–2016), Danish businesswoman
 Stanley Kauffmann (1916–2013), long-time film critic for The New Republic

Kaufman 

 Aaron Kaufman, American mechanic and fabricator, featured on the television show Fast N' Loud
 Abraham Kaufman (1885–1971), Russian-born medical doctor, community organizer and Zionist
 Alan Kaufman (writer), American novelist and poet
 Alan S. Kaufman (born 1944), psychologist/IQ test developer
 Alexis Kaufman (born 1991), birth name of American professional wrestler Alexa Bliss
 Allen Kaufman (born 1933), chess professional
 Andrew Kaufman, Canadian writer
 Andy Kaufman (1949–1984), American entertainer 
 Ariel Durant (born Chaya Kaufman, 1898–1981), historian and writer, wife of Will Durant
 Bel Kaufman (1911–2014), author of Up the Down Staircase and granddaughter of Sholom Aleichem
 Benjamin Kaufman (Medal of Honor) (March 10, 1894 – February 5, 1981), World War I Medal of Honor recipient
 Boris Kaufman, younger brother of Dziga Vertov
 Brandon Kaufman (born 1990), American football player
 Bruria Kaufman (1918–2010), Israeli theoretical physicist
 Charlie Kaufman (born 1958), American screenwriter, producer, director, and lyricist
 Dan Kaufman, special effects artist
 David Kaufman (actor) (born 1961), American voice actor
 David Kaufman (author), theater critic
 David S. Kaufman (1813–1851), American politician, Republic of Texas State Senator
 Donald Kaufman (collector) (1930–2009), American toy collector
 Edward E. "Ted" Kaufman (born 1939), American politician
 Elaine Kaufman (1929–2010), American restaurateur
 George S. Kaufman (1889–1961), American playwright
 Gerald Kaufman (1930–2017), British member of parliament
 Gordon D. Kaufman (1925–2011), American theologian
 Grace Kaufman (born 2002), American child actress
 Harold R. Kaufman (born 1926), American physicist, developed Kaufman ion source
 Henry Kaufman (born 1927), German-American economist
 Herbert Kaufman (1878–1947)
 Irving Kaufman (1910–1992), American federal judge
 Irving Kaufman (singer) (1890–1976), American entertainer
 Isidor Kaufmann (Isidore Kaufmann, 1853–1921), Hungarian Jewish painter
 Jacob Kaufman, (1847–1920), Canadian manufacturer and industrialist
 Jake Kaufman (born 1981), American video game music composer
 James Kaufman (various people)
 Jane Kaufman (1938-2021), American artist
 Josh Kaufman (born 1976), American musician and winner of NBC's The Voice season 6
 Les Kaufman, Professor of Biology at Boston University
 Lloyd Kaufman (born 1945)
 Louis Kaufman (1905–1994), violinist
 Mel Kaufman (1958–2009), football player for the Washington Redskins
 Micha Kaufman (born 1946), Israeli Olympic sport shooter
 Millard Kaufman (1917–2009), American screenwriter and novelist
 Morris Kaufman, Manitoba judge
 Moisés Kaufman (born 1963), playwright and director
 Murray the K (Murray Kaufman, 1922–1982)
 Nadeen L. Kaufman (born 1945), psychologist/IQ test developer
 Napoleon Kaufman (born 1973), American football player
 Nikolay Kaufman (born 1925), Bulgarian musicologist
 Philip Kaufman (born 1936), film director
 Philip A. Kaufman (Phil Kaufman), an American engineer, the namesake of the Phil Kaufman Award
 Robert Kaufman (1931–1991), American screenwriter and film producer
 Ruth Kaufman, British operations research specialist
 Smylie Kaufman (born 1991), professional golfer
 Steve Kaufman (1960–2010), artist
 Ted Kaufman (born 1939) was a United States Senator from Delaware from 2009 to 2010
 Terrence Kaufman (born 1937), linguist and professor at the University of Pittsburgh
 Theodore N. Kaufman (1910–1986), businessman and writer
 Wendy Kaufman (born 1958)
 William E. Kaufman, rabbi, philosopher
 Dr. Kaufman, a villain in Tomorrow Never Dies

Kauffman 

 Angelica Kauffman (1741–1807), Swiss-Austrian painter
 Calvin Henry Kauffman (1869–1931), American botanist and mycologist
 Claudia Kauffman, Washington State Senate (served 2007–2011)
 Craig Kauffman (1932–2010), Artist
 Doug Kauffman (born 1969), American curler and golfer
 Draper Kauffman (1911–1979), Rear Admiral, U.S. Navy and son of James L. Kauffman, with whom he was the joint namesake of USS Kauffman (FFG-59)
 Elizabeth Bush, born Kauffman
 Ewing Marion Kauffman (1916-1993), Former owner of the Kansas City Royals and namesake of Kauffman Stadium
 George B. Kauffman (born 1930), American chemist
 James Laurence Kauffman (1887–1963), United States Navy Vice Admiral and father of Draper Kauffman, with whom he was the joint namesake of USS Kauffman (FFG-59)
 John D. Kauffman (1847-1913), Amish "sleeping preacher"
 Leah Kauffman (born c. 1986), American actress, singer and songwriter
 Léon Kauffman (1869–1952), 12th Prime Minister of Luxembourg
 Louis Kauffman (born 1945), American mathematician
 Marta Kauffman (born 1956), TV producer and writer
 Matthew Kauffman (born 1961), journalist
 Sandra Kauffman (born 1933), American politician from Missouri 
 Scott Kauffman (born 1956), businessman
 Stuart (Alan) Kauffman (born 1939), US theoretical biologist and complex systems researcher

See also 
 Kauffman Amish Mennonite
 Kaufmann's (Kaufmann's Furniture Galleries), regional department store chain
 Kofman
 Koopman, Dutch equivalent

German-language surnames
Jewish surnames
Occupational surnames